Carson County is a county located in the U.S. state of Texas. As of the 2020 census, its population was 5,807. The county seat is Panhandle. The county was founded in 1876 and later organized in 1888. It is named for Samuel Price Carson, the first secretary of state of the Republic of Texas.

Carson County is included in the Amarillo, TX metropolitan statistical area.

History

Native Americans

Prehistoric hunter-gatherers were the first inhabitants, followed by the Plains Apache. Modern Apache tribes followed them and were displaced by Comanches. The Comanches were defeated by the United States Army in the Red River War of 1874.

Early explorations

Spanish conquistador Francisco Vásquez de Coronado explored the Llano Estacado in 1541.

County established and growth

Carson County was established in 1876 from Bexar County. The county was organized in 1888. Panhandle, the only town at the time, became the county seat.

Ranching began to be established in the county in the 1880s. The JA Ranch encompassed over a million acres (4,000 km2) within six adjoining counties.  Richard E. McNalty established the Turkey Track Ranch in 1878.
One of the early failed attempts came in 1882 when Charles G. Francklyn purchased  of railroad lands in adjoining counties to form the Francklyn Land and Cattle Company. The lands were later sold to the White Deer Lands Trust of British bondholders in 1886 and 1887.

Railroads began to reach the county by 1886 when the Atchison, Topeka and Santa Fe Railway subsidiary Southern Kansas Railway extended the line into Texas, making Panhandle City a railhead in 1888. In 1889, the Fort Worth and Denver Railway linked Panhandle City with Washburn in Armstrong County. In 1904, the Chicago, Rock Island and Gulf bought the line.   In 1908, the Southern Kansas of Texas extended its line from Panhandle City to Amarillo, thus making the Kansas-Texas-New Mexico line a major transcontinental route. The Choctaw, Oklahoma and Texas Railroad built across the southern edge of the county.

Pumping underground water with windmills resolved the issue of bringing water from Roberts County via the railroad.

White Deer in 1909 became home to Polish Catholic immigrants, who had first settled Panna Maria in Karnes County  before migrating to Carson County.

Experimental drilling by Gulf Oil Corporation led to the county's, and the Panhandle's, first oil and gas production in late 1921. Borger field was discovered in 1925, sparking much oil exploration and production of the Panhandle area.

Operations ceased August 1945, and in 1949, the site was sold to Texas Tech University at Amarillo for agricultural experimentation. Pantex reopened in 1951 as a nuclear weapons assembly plant. In 1960, Pantex began high-explosives development in support of the Lawrence Livermore National Laboratory in California. Pantex has a long-term mission to safely and securely maintain the nation's nuclear weapons stockpile and dismantle weapons retired by the military.

Geography

Major highways
  Interstate 40
  U.S. Highway 60
  State Highway 152
  State Highway 207
  Farm to Market Road 293

Adjacent counties
 Hutchinson County (north)
 Roberts County (northeast)
 Gray County (east)
 Donley County (southeast)
 Armstrong County (south)
 Randall County (southwest)
 Potter County (west)
 Moore County (northwest)

Demographics

Note: the US Census treats Hispanic/Latino as an ethnic category. This table excludes Latinos from the racial categories and assigns them to a separate category. Hispanics/Latinos can be of any race.

As of the census of 2000,  6,516 people, 2,470 households, and 1,884 families were residing in the county.  The population density was 7 people/sq mi (3/km2).  The 2,815 housing units had an average density of 3/sq mi (1/km2).  The racial makeup of the county was 93.82% White], 0.58% African American, 1.00% Native American, 0.14% Asian, 3.06% from other races, and 1.41% from two or more races.  About 7.03% of the population were Hispanics or Latinos of any race. In ancestry, 25.0% were of German, 14.2% were of Irish, 8.1% were of English, 4.7% were of American, 3.2% were of Scottish, and 3.1% were Polish.

Of the 2,470 households, 35.8% had children under living with them, 65.3% were married couples living together, 8.1% had a female householder with no husband present, and 23.7% were not families. About 22.3% of all households were made up of individuals, and 11.3% had someone living alone who was 65 or older.  The average household size was 2.60, and the average family size was 3.04.

In the county, the age distribution was 27.9% under 18, 6.2% from 18 to 24, 26.3% from 25 to 44, 23.9% from 45 to 64, and 15.7% who were 65 or older.  The median age was 39 years. For every 100 females, there were 95.80 males.  For every 100 females age 18 and over, there were 92.20 males.

Males had a median income of $34,271 versus $23,325 for females. The per capita income for the county was $19,368. About 5.40% of families and 7.30% of the population were below the poverty line, including 8.90% of those under age 18 and 9.40% of those age 65 or over.

Communities

Towns
 Groom
 Panhandle (county seat)
 Skellytown
 White Deer

Unincorporated community
 Conway

Ghost town
 Boyerllton

Education
School districts:
 Groom Independent School District
 Panhandle Independent School District
 Sanford-Fritch Independent School District
 White Deer Independent School District

All of the county is in the service area of Amarillo College.

Politics

See also

 Carson County Square House Museum
 List of museums in the Texas Panhandle
 National Register of Historic Places listings in Carson County, Texas
 Recorded Texas Historic Landmarks in Carson County

References

External links
 Carson County government's website
 Carson County in Handbook of Texas Online at the University of Texas
 Interactive Texas Map
 Texas Map Collection 
 Carson County Profile from the Texas Association of Counties

 
1888 establishments in Texas
Populated places established in 1888
Texas Panhandle